Pleasant Hill, Louisiana may refer to:

 Pleasant Hill, Bienville Parish, Louisiana, an unincorporated community
 Pleasant Hill, Lincoln Parish, Louisiana, an unincorporated community
 Pleasant Hill, Natchitoches Parish, Louisiana, an unincorporated community
 Pleasant Hill, Sabine Parish, Louisiana, a village